PTX, Vol. II (Volume 2) is the third extended play (EP) by American a cappella group Pentatonix. It was released digitally on November 5, 2013, while physical versions of the album were available from November 12, 2013. As of October 23, 2015, PTX, Vol. II has sold 199,965 copies.

Track listing

Charts

Weekly charts

Year-end charts

Personnel 
 Pentatonix
 Mitch Grassi - tenor lead and backing vocals
 Scott Hoying - baritone lead and backing vocals
 Kirstin Maldonado - alto lead and backing vocals
 Avi Kaplan - vocal bass, bass lead and backing vocals
 Kevin Olusola - vocal percussion, spoken vocals on "Can't Hold Us", backing vocals on "I Need Your Love" and "Run to You"

 Production
 Ben Bram - production
Bill Hare - audio engineering

References

Pentatonix EPs
2013 EPs
Covers EPs
Madison Gate Records EPs
Sequel albums